Kajal is another name for kohl or kajol, an eye cosmetic in use since ancient times. 

Kajal may also refer to:

People
 Kajal Aggarwal (born 1985), Indian actress
 Kajal Ahmad (born 1967), Kurdish poet
 Kajal Kiran, Indian actress who debuted in 1977
 Kajal Mukherjee, Indian footballer

Places
 Kajal (village), a village in Slovakia
 Kajal, Iran, a village in Ardabil Province, Iran

Films
 Kajal (1962 film)
 Kaajal, a 1965 Hindi film

See also

Kaja (name)
 Kajol (born 1974), Indian film actress